This is a round-up of the 1973 Sligo Senior Football Championship. St. Patrick's regained the Owen B. Hunt Cup in this year after defeating Craobh Rua in the final. A new name appeared in the Championship entrants this year - Eastern Harps, an amalgamation of Keash, 1964 finalists and intermittent competitors at Senior level, and Gurteen.

First round

Quarter-finals

Semi-finals

Sligo Senior Football Championship Final

References

 Sligo Champion (Autumn 1973)

Sligo Senior Football Championship
Sligo